U.S. Route 36 (US 36) is a part of the United States Numbered Highway System that runs from Rocky Mountain National Park, Colorado to Uhrichsville, Ohio. In the state of Indiana, it is part of the Indiana State Road system that runs across the central portion of the state from the Illinois state line near Dana to the Ohio state line near Spartanburg. In the Indianapolis area, US 36 overlaps the southern section of Interstate 465 (I-465), bypassing the downtown area where the route formerly went.

Route description

Illinois state line to Indianapolis
Entering into Indiana, US 36 continues eastward in a straight line, serving Dana via SR 71. Just west of Highland and Hillsdale, the route meets SR 63 at a parclo interchange. The route then crosses over the Wabash River and enters Montezuma. After meandering eastward, the route intersects with US 41 in Rockville before entering the town's downtown area. Further east, the route serves the following routes and towns: SR 59 in Bellmore, Hollandsburg west of a lake, Morton, US 231, Bainbridge, SR 75 in New Winchester, SR 39 in Danville, Gale, and SR 267 in Avon. Entering through the city limit of Indianapolis, US 36 meets I-465/I-74 at another parclo interchange. US 36 is directed to travel along the southern loop of I-465. Rockville Road continues east toward downtown Indianapolis.

Indianapolis to Lawrence
Along the southern loop portion of I-465, the road contains numerous signed (Interstate highways) and unsigned (US and state highways) concurrencies. Shortly after US 36 gets onto I-465, US 40 joins the concurrency southward. The next two exits (Sam Jones Expressway and I-70) serve the Indianapolis International Airport. The interchange with I-70 is a combination interchange. After leaving the vicinity of the airport, the beltway begins to curve eastward. At the next exit after I-70, SR 67 joins the concurrency. South of the Harding Street Generating Station and a quarry, the beltway meets a future interchange with I-69/SR 37 as well as the present SR 37 interchange after it. At the moment, SR 37 (along with future I-69) runs along the route. At the next interchange, US 31 enters the beltway eastward. The beltway then meets I-65 at another combination interchange. After curving north, the I-74 splits off eastward, while US 421 joins northward. US 52 then enters the beltway northward; at this point until the next exit, this section has the highest amount of routes (8 routes). At the next exit, US 40 branches off eastward. The beltway then meets I-70 at yet another combination interchange. US 36, along with SR 67, eventually diverges northeastward at the city limit of Lawrence.

Lawrence to Ohio state line
Both US 36 and SR 67 travel along Pendleton Pike on their way to Pendleton. Between Lawrence and Pendleton, the routes intersect SR 234 in McCordsville, enter the communities of Woodbury, Fortville, and Ingalls. In Pendleton, SR 9 travels northward with the concurrency. Shortly after intersecting with SR 38, US 36 turns east, while SR 38 continues north toward I-69. For the remainder of the route in Indiana, US 36 comes across the following: SR 109 in Emporia, Mechanicsburg, Sulphur Springs, SR 3 east of Mount Summit, SR 103, Mooreland, US 35 in Losantsville, SR 1 in Modoc, US 27 in Lynn, and SR 277.  after SR 277, US 36 enters the state of Ohio.

History
Initially, the US 36 alignment between Montezuma and Indianapolis was signed as State Road 31. In 1926, US 36 was formed to replace SR 31 as a whole. The state route number also conflicted with another U.S. route with the same number, which necessitated the removal of SR 31.

After US 36 was formed, the route in Indiana only traveled from the Illinois state line to US 40 (Washington Street) in Indianapolis. In 1931, US 36 was extended from Indianapolis to the state line at Union City (destined toward Cadiz) via SR 67 (Indianapolis to Muncie) and SR 28 (Muncie to Ohio state line). The state routes were retained however. The next year, SR 28 was relocated northward, while SR 32 took the place of SR 28's former alignment. Later that year, US 36 was rerouted southward from Pendleton to Greenville along, in large part, its current routing.

Up until 1975, US 36 traveled along the following roads in Indianapolis: Rockville Road, Washington Street, West Street, Northwestern Avenue, 38th Street, and Pendleton Pike. From 1975 onwards, US 36 was rerouted along the southern edge of I-465.

Major intersections

References

External links

 Indiana
36